Christopher Paul Henzel is an American diplomat.  From 2019 to 2021 he served as the United States Ambassador to Yemen.

Education and career
Henzel earned a Bachelor of Arts degree from the College of the Holy Cross and a Master of Science from the National War College.

From January 2017 until April 2019, Henzel was chargé d'affaires ad interim at the American Embassy in Riyadh, Saudi Arabia.  From 2013 to 2016, he was director of the Office of Israel and Palestinian Affairs at the State Department in Washington.  From 2010 to 2011, he headed the provincial reconstruction office in Mosul, Iraq.  He has also served as deputy chief of mission in Manama, Bahrain; and counselor for political affairs in Amman, Jordan. His earlier overseas postings included an assignment in Yemen from 1997 to 1999.  He studied Arabic in Tunisia.  Henzel entered the foreign service in 1985.

United States Ambassador to Yemen
On September 21, 2018, President Trump nominated Henzel to be the next United States Ambassador to Yemen. On January 2, 2019, the Senate confirmed his nomination by voice vote. Henzel concluded his term in May 2021.

Personal life
Henzel speaks Arabic, Spanish and German.

See also

List of ambassadors appointed by Donald Trump

References

External links 

Living people
Year of birth missing (living people)
Place of birth missing (living people)
Ambassadors of the United States to Yemen
College of the Holy Cross alumni
National War College alumni
21st-century American diplomats